The 1943–44 season was the 42nd season of competitive football in Belgium. R Antwerp FC won their 3rd Premier Division title. The Belgium national football team did not play any official match during the season.

Overview
At the end of the season, TSV Lyra and R Tilleur FC were relegated to Division I, while Sint-Niklaas SK (Division I A winner) and RFC Liégeois (Division I B winner) were promoted to the Premier Division. However, due to the latter stages of World War II, 4 clubs did not take part to the next Premier Division season: R Antwerp FC, R Beerschot AC, K Liersche SK and R Berchem Sport.

ASV Oostende KM, K Tubantia FC, R Uccle Sport and R Fléron FC were relegated from Division I to Promotion, to be replaced by RCS Hallois, RC Lokeren, UR Namur and Beringen FC.

Honours

Final league tables

Premier Division

References